Pinnacle Hills Promenade is a retail lifestyle center in Rogers, Arkansas. Opened in 2006, it features Bass Pro Shops, Dillard's, J. C. Penney,  Target, and Best Buy as its anchor stores. It also includes a Malco Theatres movie theater and Dave & Buster's. Adjacent to the mall is a power center, Pinnacle Hills Crossing, which features several big-box stores.

History
The center was first announced in 2003. General Growth Properties developed the center in April 2005 and it opened October 6, 2006. Anchor stores included JCPenney, Dillard's, and Malco Theatres. 

The development included an adjacent power center that includes Bed Bath & Beyond, Gordmans, Old Navy, PetSmart, TJ Maxx, Ulta and Kirkland's. 

Among the first tenants in the mall was the first Bonefish Grill in Arkansas. Target was later added. Borders Books & Music, another original tenant, closed in 2011. In early 2012, the building became the second Arkansas location of The Fresh Market. That same year, Houlihan's opened its first Arkansas location in a space vacated by Granite City Food & Brewery. Cabela's also opened at the mall in 2012.

References

External links
Pinnacle Hills Promenade

Shopping malls in Arkansas
Shopping malls established in 2006
Brookfield Properties
Lifestyle centers (retail)
Tourist attractions in Benton County, Arkansas
Buildings and structures in Rogers, Arkansas
2006 establishments in Arkansas